The St Kilda Saints Baseball Club is a baseball club based in the inner Melbourne suburb of St Kilda. The club, formed in 1879, is the oldest baseball club in Australia and played a series of games against the touring Georgia Minstrels.

The Club currently fields senior teams in summer in the Baseball Victoria Summer League in Division 3 and 4. In winter, the club fields senior teams in the Melbourne Winter Baseball League in B and C grades, and Junior Teams in the Little League Mariners Charter.

History
The St Kilda Baseball Club was formed in 1879 to play against the traveling Hick Georgia Minstrels, However once the Minstrels left Melbourne, Victoria, the club went into recess. The Club reformed in 1889 with the establishment of the Victorian Baseball League.

The St Kilda Baseball Club was one of the 8 clubs that succeeded from the original Victorian Baseball League in 1915 to form the Victorian Baseball Union, the others being Melbourne, East Melbourne, South Melbourne, Fitzroy, Carlton, Richmond, Collingwood, and Hawthorn.

References

External links
St Kilda Baseball Club
Baseball Victoria Summer League
Melbourne Winter Baseball League

Australian baseball clubs
Baseball teams in Melbourne
Baseball club
Baseball teams established in 1879
1879 establishments in Australia
Sport in the City of Port Phillip